Marie Luise Kaschnitz (born Marie Luise von Holzing-Berslett; 31 January 1901 – 10 October 1974) was a German short story writer, novelist, essayist and poet. She is considered to be one of the leading post-war German poets.

She was born in Karlsruhe.  She married archaeologist Guido Freiherr Von Kaschnitz-Weinberg (the author of The Mediterranean Foundations of Ancient Art) in 1925, and travelled with him on archaeological expeditions.

She received high praise for her short stories, many of which were inspired by events in her life, complemented by her personal reminiscences.  These stories were collected in books such as Orte and Engelsbrücke. She enjoyed travel greatly and her tales make use of diverse settings. They are thoughtful in nature, rather than eventful, often dealing with particular stages in a woman's life or a relationship. Her main collection is Lange Schatten ("Long Shadows"). Her favorite story was 1961's "Das dicke Kind".

Her post-war essay collection in Menschen und Dinge 1945 established her reputation in Germany. Her poems dealt with the war and the early post-war period, often expressing a yearning for a peaceful past, but also hope for the future. In the volume Dein Schweigen – meine Stimme she dealt with the death of her husband. After 1960 she became influenced by Pablo Neruda.

She briefly taught poetics at the University of Frankfurt. She was a member of PEN. She won many prizes, including the Georg Büchner Prize in 1955 and the Roswitha Prize in 1973. She was nominated for the 1967 Nobel Prize in Literature. She died, aged 73, in Rome.  The Marie Luise Kaschnitz Prize is named in her honor.

Works

Liebe beginnt (1988) – novel
Elissa (1988) – novel
Griechische Mythen (1988) – Greek myths
Menschen und Dinge 1988. Zwölf Essays (1988) – essays
Gedichte (1947) – poetry
Totentanz und Gedichte zur Zeit (1947) – a play and poetry
Gustave Courbet. Roman eines Malerlebens (also: Die Wahrheit, nicht der Traum) (1950) – novel
Zukunftsmusik (1950) – poetry
Ewige Stadt (1952) – poetry about Rome
Das dicke Kind (1952) – short stories
Engelsbrücke. Römische Betrachtungen (1955) – reflections
Das Haus der Kindheit (1956) – novel
Der Zöllner Matthäus (1956) – radio play (script)
Lange Schatten (1960) – short stories
Ein Gartenfest (1961) – radio play (script)
Dein Schweigen – meine Stimme (1962) – poetry
Hörspiele (1962) – radio plays
Einer von zweien (1962)
Wohin denn ich : Aufzeichnungen (1963) – reflections
Überallnie (1965) – selected poems
Ein Wort weiter (1965) – poetry
Ferngespräche (1966) – short stories
Beschreibung eines Dorfes (1966) – experimental novel
Tage, Tage, Jahre (1968) – reflections
Vogel Rock. Unheimliche Geschichten (1969) – stories
Steht noch dahin (1970) – autobiographical reflections
Zwischen Immer und Nie. Gestalten und Themen der Dichtung (1971) – essays on poetry
Gespräche im All (1971) – radio plays
Eisbären (1972) – selected stories
Kein Zauberspruch (1972) – poems 1962–1972
Gesang vom Menschenleben (1974) – poetry
Florens. Eichendorffs Jugend (1974)
Der alte Garten. Ein modernes Märchen (1975)
Orte (1975) – autobiographical reflections
Die drei Wanderer (1980) – ballad
Jennifers Träume. Unheimliche Geschichten (1984) – stories
Notizen der Hoffnung (1984) – essays
Orte und Menschen (1986) – reflections, posthumous
Menschen und Dinge (1986) – reflections, posthumous
Liebesgeschichten (ed. E. Borchers) (1986) – love stories
Tagebücher aus den Jahren 1936–1966 (2000) – diaries

British/American editions
The House of Childhood (Das Haus der Kindheit)
Circe's Mountain – story selections
Whether or Not (Steht noch dahin)
Selected Later Poems of Marie Luise Kaschnitz (ed. Lisel Mueller)
Long Shadows (Lange Schatten)

Notes

External links
German site on Kaschnitz
author page at Lyrikline.org, with audio and text. 

1901 births
1974 deaths
Writers from Karlsruhe
People from the Grand Duchy of Baden
German women poets
German women novelists
Georg Büchner Prize winners
Recipients of the Pour le Mérite (civil class)
20th-century German women writers
20th-century German novelists
20th-century German poets
German-language poets